The depressed area between the crura is termed the interpeduncular fossa, and consists of a layer of gray matter, the posterior perforated substance, which is pierced by small apertures for the transmission of blood vessels; its lower part lies on the ventral aspect of the medial portions of the tegmenta, and contains a nucleus named the interpeduncular ganglion; its upper part assists in forming the floor of the third ventricle.

See also
 Anterior perforated substance

Additional images

References

External links
 
 

Central nervous system